Chawli is a village in the District Chakwal Punjab province of Pakistan. It is located at 33°1'36N 72°34'1E with an altitude of 403 metres (1325 feet). Members of the Kassar tribe make up the bulk of the population. It is one of a cluster of villages such as Balkassar, Dhudial, Mangwal and Balokassar.

References

Populated places in Chakwal District